Robert Jenner is an English hockey player with the Romford Raiders of the EPIHL. Jenner played his first senior game for the Raiders in 2000 and has progressed well since. Despite still being eligible to play for the Under-19's he was registered to play for the Raiders the previous season.

References

English ice hockey defencemen
Living people
Year of birth missing (living people)
Place of birth missing (living people)